Busandaegyo is a bridge in Busan, South Korea. The bridge connects the districts of Yeongdo District and Jung District. The bridge was completed in 1980. 

Bridges completed in 1980
Bridges in Busan
Yeongdo District
Jung District, Busan
Arch bridges in South Korea